Errol Ivor White CBE FRS FLS FGS (30 June 1901 – 11 January 1985) was a British geologist. He was President of the Ray Society from 1956 to 1959 and President of the Linnean Society of London from 1964 to 1967.

He was educated at Highgate School and King's College London (Tennant Prizeman).

He was elected a Fellow of the Royal Society in 1956. He was awarded the Murchison Medal in 1962 and the Linnean Gold Medal in 1970.

References

1901 births
1985 deaths
People educated at Highgate School
Alumni of King's College London
Fellows of King's College London
Presidents of the Linnean Society of London
Fellows of the Royal Society
Commanders of the Order of the British Empire
Fellows of the Geological Society of London
Fellows of the Linnean Society of London
20th-century British geologists